The Church of the Holy Cross  is a church in Troy, New York, United States. It was added to the National Register of Historic Places in New York in 1973. It borders the Rensselaer Polytechnic Institute campus to the East and South.

The church was founded by Mary Warren in the early 1840s. Under the direction of Mary Warren's son, Nathan B. Warren, the church nave was built from designs by Alexander Jackson Davis in 1844. The chancel addition, by Richard Upjohn, was completed in late 1848 and dedicated in January, 1849. In 1846, the Church instituted one of the first choirs at an Episcopal church in the United States. During the full choral service, the psalter, creed and responses of the English Cathedral Service are chanted by the choir while the officiant intones his part. In 1863, the Mary Warren Free Institute was built adjoining the church to the south in order to further religious and musical instruction. The Institute still exists to this day.

Closure
Due to declining membership, the church closed on December 6, 2009. Rensselaer Polytechnic Institute successfully purchased the property.

References

Churches completed in 1844
19th-century Episcopal church buildings
Rensselaer Polytechnic Institute
National Register of Historic Places in Troy, New York
Churches in Troy, New York
Churches on the National Register of Historic Places in New York (state)